Knowth is a Neolithic passage grave and an ancient monument of the World Heritage Site of Brú na Bóinne located 8.4 km west of Drogheda in Ireland's valley of the River Boyne. It is the largest passage grave of the Brú na Bóinne complex. It consists of a large mound (known as Site 1) and 17 smaller satellite tombs. It contains two passages placed along an east-west line and is encircled by 127 kerbstones, of which three are missing, and four badly damaged.

The large mound has been estimated to date from c. 3200 BC. The passages are independent of each other, leading to separate burial chambers. The eastern passage arrives at a cruciform chamber, not unlike that found at Newgrange, which contains three recesses and basin stones into which the cremated remains of the dead were placed. The right-hand recess is larger and more elaborately decorated with megalithic art than the others, which is typical for Irish passage graves of this type. The western passage ends in an undifferentiated chamber, which is separated from the passage by a sill stone. The chamber seems to have also contained a basin stone which was later removed and is now located about two-thirds down the passageway.

Megalithic art

Knowth contains more than a third of the total number of examples of megalithic art in all of Western Europe; over 200 decorated stones were found during excavations.  Much of the artwork is found on the kerbstones, particularly approaching the entrances to the passages.

Many of the motifs are typical: spirals, lozenges and serpentiform.  However, the megalithic art at Knowth contains a wide variety of images, such as crescent shapes, and the oldest known illustration of the moon in history. Much of this artwork was carved on the backs of the stones; a type of megalithic art known as hidden art. This suggests all manner of theories as regards the function of megalithic art within the Neolithic community who built the monuments in the Boyne valley.  It is possible that they intended the art to be hidden.  It is also possible that they simply recycled the stones and reused the other side.

History
There is some evidence for late Neolithic and Bronze Age activity on the site.  Most of this stems from the existence of a grooved ware timber circle located near the entrance to the eastern passage. Archeological evidence suggests that this was used as a ritual or sacred area after the great mound at Knowth had already fallen into disuse.  Evidence for ritual consists of a large number of votive offerings found in and around the immediate areas of the timbers that formed the circle.

The hill at Knowth fell into disrepair, and the mound or cairn slipped, causing the entrances to both passages to be covered. The site remained practically unused for a period of two thousand years. The site was briefly used as a burial site; some 35 cist graves were found on the site during excavations.

In the late Iron Age and early Christian period, it became a hill fort with encircling ditches and souterrains added.  Knowth became a habitational site for the first time. Two ditches were dug, one at the base of the mound behind the kerbstones, and the other at the top. At this stage, the entrances to both passages seem to have been discovered. Evidence includes early Christian graffiti on the stones in the eastern chamber, and four names were carved in ogham. It seems it was at this stage that the basin stone from the western chamber was moved in an attempt to remove it and was abandoned in the passage because it got stuck. Knowth became a significant political site and the capital of the Kingdom of Northern Brega.

After a brief military interlude following the Norman invasion of Ireland, when the Normans used Knowth as a motte in the 12th century, the site came into the possession of the Cistercian monks of Mellifont Abbey. It seems that the mound was then again used as a grange or farm. Stone walls were built over the mound, and stone buildings within the walls.  After the dissolution of the monasteries, the site was used mainly for agriculture until most of the site was taken over by the state in 1939.

A historical reference to the cave is to be found in the Triads of Ireland, dating from the 14th to the 19th century, where ",  and " are listed under the heading, "the three darkest places in Ireland". The last, meaning the "Cave of the Alders", is generally thought to be the present Dunmore Cave, while the first two translate as the caves of Knowth and the caves of Slaney. It is not known which exact system of caves/passage tombs near the river Slaney is being referred to, with the most likely being those at Baltinglass. Other sources translate the listed locations as Rath Croghan, the cave or crypt of Slane and the "Cave of the Ferns".

The east-west orientation of the passages at Knowth suggests astronomical alignment with the equinoxes. The alignment at Knowth does not occur today. This is due to a number of factors. First of all, the passages were discovered by later settlers and were, to some extent, destroyed or incorporated into souterrains. In this way the original entrances to the passages were distorted or destroyed, making it difficult to establish if an alignment ever existed. Further, the recent excavations (1962 onwards) under George Eogan resulted in the erection of a concrete slab wall inside the mound's west entrance, restricting any investigation into the possible alignments. It seems likely that the passages were intended to align. Also, the alignments of ancient monuments can change due to Milankovitch cycles.

A brief excavation of the site was carried out in 1941 by Macallister. However, major full-scale excavations began on the site in 1962 and were undertaken by George Eogan of University College Dublin. When his excavations began, very little was known about the full extent of the site. The entrances to the western and eastern passages were discovered in 1967 and 1968 respectively, and, slowly, the layers of activity at the site of Knowth were uncovered. The excavation has produced numerous books and reports on the findings.  The archaeological excavation of Knowth East ended any chance of research on alignments when George Eogan erected the concrete wall across the east-passage entrance.  The most extensive research on alignments and astronomy at Knowth was carried out by American-Irish researcher Martin Brennan.

Access

Access is by guided tour only. Tours begin at the Brú na Bóinne Visitor Centre in Donore. Visitors can look down the eastern passage and visit the nearby modern interpretive room.

References

Sources
 Byrne, Francis John, Irish Kings and High-Kings. Batsford, London, 1973. .
 Mac Shamhráin, Ailbhe, "Church and dynasty in Early Christian Brega: Lusk, Inis Pátraic and the cast of Máel-Finnia, king and saint", Table 8.1, Lineages of Síl nÁedo Sláine, p. 127; in The Island of St Patrick: Church and ruling dynasties in Fingal and Meath, 400–1148, (ed.) Mac Shamhráin, Four Courts, 2004.

External links

 Excavations at Knowth Digital Repository of Ireland; online edition of 6-volume Royal Irish Academy record
 Brú na Bóinne > Built heritage > Knowth worldheritageireland.ie
Knowth.com
Meath Tourism Information
MegalithicIreland.com
Brú na Bóinne in myth and folklore

4th-millennium BC architecture
Archaeological sites in County Meath
World Heritage Sites in the Republic of Ireland
Tourist attractions in County Meath
Rock art in Europe
Royal sites of Ireland
Boyne culture
Tombs in the Republic of Ireland